Froggattella latispina is a species of ant in the genus Froggattella. Described by William Morton Wheeler in 1936, the species is endemic to Australia, although it is considered rare.

References

Dolichoderinae
Insects described in 1936
Hymenoptera of Australia